Susanne von Caemmerer FRS is a professor and plant physiologist in the Division of Plant Sciences, Research School of Biology at the Australian National University; and the Deputy Director of the ARC Centre of Excellence for Translational Photosynthesis. She has been a leader in developing and refining biochemical models of photosynthesis.

Education 
von Caemmerer received a Bachelor of Arts degree in mathematics in 1976 from Australian National University, she received her PhD in plant physiology in 1981.

Career and Research 
With Graham Farquhar and Joe Berry, her early work in plant physiology led to the development of a biochemical model of C3 photosynthesis. The model that mathematically describes the balance of photosynthetic limitations between light-driven energy supply and carbon diffusion substrate supply has become a cornerstone of research into photosynthesis at the leaf-level and carbon fluxes at larger scales.

She currently serves on the editorial board of the journal Plant, Cell & Environment.

Honours and awards 
She was awarded the Charles F. Kettering Award in recognition of her excellence in the field of photosynthesis in 2014 by the American Society of Plant Biologists.

She was elected a fellow of the Australian Academy of Science, the German Academy of Sciences Leopoldina in 2006 and a Fellow of the Royal Society in 2017.

References

Year of birth missing (living people)
Place of birth missing (living people)
Living people
Academic staff of the Australian National University
20th-century Australian botanists
Fellows of the Australian Academy of Science
Female Fellows of the Royal Society
Fellows of the Royal Society
21st-century Australian botanists
20th-century Australian women scientists